Shui Pin Wai is a walled village in Wang Chau, Yuen Long District, Hong Kong.

Administration
Shui Pin Wai is a recognized village under the New Territories Small House Policy. It is one of the 37 villages represented within the Ping Shan Rural Committee. For electoral purposes, Shui Pin Wai is part of the Ping Shan Central constituency, which is currently represented by Felix Cheung Chi-yeung.

Education
Shui Pin Wai is in Primary One Admission (POA) School Net 73. Within the school net are multiple aided schools (operated independently but funded with government money) and one government school: South Yuen Long Government Primary School (南元朗官立小學).

See also
 Walled villages of Hong Kong
 Shui Pin Tsuen
 Shui Pin Wai Estate
 Shui Pin Wai stop

References

External links

 Delineation of area of existing village Shui Pin Wai (Ping Shan) for election of resident representative (2019 to 2022)

Walled villages of Hong Kong
Wang Chau (Yuen Long)
Villages in Yuen Long District, Hong Kong